Critter of the Week is a weekly RNZ National programme about endangered and neglected native plants and animals of New Zealand.

Beginning in 2015, Critter of the Week is an approximately 15-minute discussion between Nicola Toki of the Department of Conservation and host Jesse Mulligan on an "uncharismatic and lovable" New Zealand species. The topic of spotlighting uncharismatic species was raised in an interview by Mulligan in April 2015, and the programme originated in a discussion between Mulligan and Toki about threatened bird conservation, in which she lamented a lack of attention and corporate funding for species such as the Smeagol gravel maggot. The first episode, airing 2 October 2015, featured the New Zealand bat fly. Each week's broadcast is supported by improving the Wikipedia article for the species in question. The show currently airs on Friday afternoons.

In 2018, artist Giselle Clarkson designed t-shirts featuring a selection of species that had appeared on the programme. In September–October 2018, a "Critter of the Week: Bake-off" competition invited listeners to bake a cake in the shape of their favourite "critter".

The Critter of the Week project was the subject of a lightning talk by Mike Dickison for the 2018 ESEAP Conference in Bali, Indonesia. An updated presentation was given at the Wikimedia Australia Melbourne meetup in November 2018. Critter of the Week was discussed as an example of a museum outreach at the 2018 SPNHC conference in Dunedin.

References

External links 
RNZ National Critter of the Week page
Department of Conservation Critter of the Week page

RNZ National
New Zealand radio programmes
2015 radio programme debuts
Science radio programmes
Biota of New Zealand
Critter of the Week